The Norwegian Office of the Prime Minister (abbreviated SMK) is a cabinet department that assists the Cabinet of Norway and the Prime Minister of Norway in the leadership of the Cabinet and Government. It has since 2021 been led by Prime Minister Jonas Gahr Støre (Labour Party). The office has about 55 employees.

History
Since the establishment of the first Norwegian government, in 1814, the Prime Minister has had secretaries to help him with tasks, though these were not collectively assigned to his office until 1945. The office was given the current title in 1950, but not formally created until 1956. In 1969 the central secretariat for the entire cabinet also became part of the Office of the Prime Minister.

Employees

References

External links
 

Government ministries of Norway
Norway, Office of the Prime Minister
Norway
1956 establishments in Norway